St. Ninian's Cathedral, Perth (Scottish Gaelic: Cathair-eaglais Naomh Ninian) is a cathedral of the Scottish Episcopal Church in the Diocese of St Andrews, Dunkeld and Dunblane.

History

The Scottish Episcopal Church was disestablished in 1689 and all the Scottish cathedrals became the property of the Presbyterian Church either falling into disuse or becoming adapted for the Presbyterian rite.  In 1848 two young Scottish aristocrats at Oxford University conceived the idea of reviving cathedrals for the Episcopalians and the London architect William Butterfield was chosen to design a cathedral for Perth.  £5751 was raised by subscription and of this less than £150 came from local sources the bulk coming from the families of Lord Forbes and the Hon. George Boyle.  This was enough to build the chancel and one bay of the nave and the north wall to its full eventual length to be consecrated on 10 December 1850. The bishop of the diocese, the Rt. Rev. Patrick Torry aged eighty-six was too frail to preside and the ceremonies were conducted by the Rt. Rev. Alexander Penrose Forbes of Brechin.  The patrons wanted to name it St. John the Apostle's presumably as some sort of riposte to the Presbyterians with St John's Kirk named after the Baptist but Bishop Torry named it after St. Ninian who brought the  Christian message to Scotland in the 5th century and it was the first to be consecrated in the UK following the reformation.  Stained glass to the design of Butterfield and made by Alexander Gibbs was added in 1876 to the east window showing ‘The one seated on the throne’ from Revelation 4:1ff.  Under its first provost worship was Roman Catholic in everything but name which was wholly unacceptable to the Rt. Rev. Charles Wordsmith, elected to succeed Torry following his death in 1852.  In its first thirty years congregations rarely went above twenty in number but with the appointment in 1885 of the Rev. Vincent Rorison as (Scottish) provost the attendance increased and it was decided to complete William Butterfield's original design with alterations to the towers at the west end and completed in 1890.  All the stained glass added subsequently is by Burlison and Grylls. Following the death of Wordsworth in 1892 the Rt. Rev. George Howard Wilkinson who had earlier retired as Bishop of Truro was elected to succeed him and he engaged John Loughborough Pearson, the architect of Truro cathedral to carry out alterations and additions, the work beginning in 1900 including a design for the Chapter House and Lady Chapel completed in 1908 with an east window by the Whitefriars Glass Co. Following his death in 1907 Wilkinson was commemorated with a statue by Sir George Frampton in bronze.  Further additions to the cloisters were added by Tarbolton & Ochterlony in 1936.

The cathedral was designated as a Category A listed building in 1965.

Former provosts
Former provosts of the cathedral include Edward Fortescue; he became Provost of St Ninian's Cathedral in 1851 but resigned in 1871 when he converted to Roman Catholicism.

See also
List of Category A listed buildings in Perth and Kinross
List of listed buildings in Perth, Scotland

References

External links

St Ninian's Cathedral (Scottish Episcopal Church)

Category A listed buildings in Perth and Kinross
Perth
Churches completed in 1850
Ninian
Listed cathedrals in Scotland
William Butterfield buildings
Listed buildings in Perth, Scotland